Local elections in Siquijor were held on May 9, 2022 as part of the 2022 Philippine general election. Voters elected all local posts in the province: town mayors, vice mayors, town councilors, as well as members of the Sangguniang Panlalawigan - three in each of the province's two administrative districts, the governor, vice governor, and one representative for lone district of Siquijor.

The province's election turnout is 88.08%, (162 election returns) equivalent to 69,103 out of 78,458 total registered voters.

Provincial elections

Governor
Zaldy Villa is the incumbent but term-limited. He ran for district representative and won.

By Municipality

Vice-Governor
Mei Ling Quezon-Brown is the incumbent.

By Municipality

Sangguniang Panlalawigan

1st District
Municipalities: Enrique Villanueva, Larena, Siquijor
Population (2020): 50,159
Electorate (2022): 39,184
Turnout (2022): 34,346 (87.65%)
Parties are as stated in their certificates of candidacy.

|bgcolor=black colspan=5|

2nd District
Municipalities: Maria, Lazi, San Juan
Population (2020): 53,236
Electorate (2022): 43,406
Turnout (2022): 38,369 (88.40%)
Parties are as stated in their certificates of candidacy. 

  

|bgcolor=black colspan=5|

Congressional election 
Population (2020):  103,395
Electorate (2022):  78,458 (162 election returns)
Turnout (2022):  69,103 (88.08%)
Jake Vincent Villa is the incumbent. He is now running for governor.

Municipal elections
The mayor and vice mayor with the highest number of votes win the seat; they are voted separately, therefore, they may be of different parties when elected. Parties are as stated in their certificates of candidacy.

Enrique Villanueva
Electorate (2022):  5,343 (14 Election Returns)
Turnout (2022):  4,720 (88.34%)
Gerold Pal-ing is the incumbent but term-limited. He ran for councilor instead. Incumbent vice-mayor Leonardo Paculba gunned for mayor but defeated.

Larena
Electorate (2022):  11,962 (28 election returns)
Turnout (2022):  10,041 (83.94%)
Dean Villa is the incumbent but now running for governor of the province. Incumbent vice-mayor Cyrus Vincent Calibo is now vying for mayor of the town.

Lazi
Electorate (2022):  16,139 (26 election returns)
Turnout (2022):  14,296 (88.58%)
James Monte and Earl Aljas are the incumbents and reelectionists. Both were defeated.

Maria
Electorate (2022):  11,128 (24 election returns)
Turnout (2022):  9,777 (87.86%)
Meynard Asok is the incumbent but term limited. He ran for board member. Incumbent vice-mayor Ivy Dan Samson is a reelectionist and won.

San Juan
Electorate (2022):  12,007 (24 election returns)
Turnout (2022):  10,684 (88.98%)
Incumbents Wilfredo Capundag Jr. and Gemma Cenas are all vied for mayor of the town. Capundag won.

Siquijor
Electorate (2022):  21,879 (48 election returns)
Turnout (2022):  19,585 (89.52%)
Richard Quezon and Teodoro Jumawan Jr. are the incumbents and reelectionist.

References

External links
COMELEC - Official website of the Philippine Commission on Elections (COMELEC)
NAMFREL - Official website of National Movement for Free Elections (NAMFREL)
PPCRV - Official website of the Parish Pastoral Council for Responsible Voting (PPCRV)

2022 Philippine local elections
May 2022 events in the Philippines